Hartwig (died 866) was the tenth Bishop of Passau from 840 to 866.

Hartwig was the head of the Königskloster Tegernsee, and perhaps a member of the Hofkapelle and a family member of King Ludwig of Germany.

In 862 or 863 he suffered a serious stroke, and spent his remaining years largely disabled. In 866, he was succeeded by Ermanrich as new Bishop of Passau.

References

Sources
 

Year of birth unknown
Year of death unknown
Roman Catholic bishops of Passau
9th-century bishops in Bavaria